Soulful Fruit is the first album by the turntablist Rob Swift. It was released on May 13, 1997, by Stones Throw Records and was produced by Rob Swift, Mista Sinista and Roc Raida. The album was a huge critical success, gaining many positive reviews. Soulful Fruit is regarded by many as one of the best turntablism albums ever made.

Track listing
"Define Music" - 1:24
"Introduction" - 0:54
"Itchy Vibes And Drums" - 2:07
"Cutting With Class" - 2:17
"Interlude 1: Babu Speaks" feat. Babu - 1:15
"The Mad Scientist of the Turntables" - 1:49
"Relax Mode" - 4:08
"This Is a Remix" - 2:00
"Interlude 2: Bruce Lee Speaks" feat. Bruce Lee - 1:23
"Some Ol' Rough Shit" - 1:46
"A Natural High" - 2:31
"A Scratch Is A Musical Note" - 4:05
"Diamond Jay Will Spin It" - 5:06
"Rob Swift Versus Rahzel" feat. Rahzel - 14:16
"A Turntable Experience" - 4:20
"Interlude 3: Message" - 3:18
"Women And Stress" - 1:28
"Women And Stress 2" - 1:28
"Let The Drummer Get Some" - 1:00
"Interlude 4: Bruce Lee Speaks Again" - 0:51
"Who Is It? Mista Sinista" - 3:28

References

Rob Swift albums
1997 debut albums
Stones Throw Records albums